

The viola pomposa (also known as the violino pomposo) is a five-stringed instrument developed around 1725. There are no exact dimensions applicable to all instruments used under this name, although in general the pomposa is slightly wider than a standard viola (hence the Italian adjective "pomposa"). It uses four viola strings, tuned conventionally (C-G-D-A), with the addition of a high E string (usually a violin string), giving it a greater range than the orchestral viola; the trade-off comes in a sound which is slightly more resonant than a violin. The viola pomposa is played on the arm and has a range from C3 to A6 (or even higher) with fingered notes. Using harmonics, the range can be extended to C8 depending on the quality of the strings.

The viola pomposa should not be confused with the viola da spalla, the violoncello, or the violoncello piccolo (read Paulinyi, 2012. In English: Paulinyi, 2010).

Among the late Baroque and early Classical composers who used the instrument are Georg Philipp Telemann (1681–1767; two sections of Der Getreue Musikmeister), Johann Gottlieb Graun (c. 1703–1771; a double concerto with flute), and Christian Joseph Lidarti (1730–1795; at least two sonatas).

By 1800, the instrument was used by principals of major orchestras, although no written scores were published in that century, apart from antiquarian or modernized editions (one of the Lidarti sonatas, heavily edited and with an added cadenza, was republished around 1904).

Late in the twentieth century, several contemporary composers independently rediscovered its potential because of the development of the new synthetic strings, more stable and cheaper than the gut ones. Recent music for the instrument includes works by Justin E.A. Busch, Harry Crowl, Rudolf Haken, and Zoltan Paulinyi.

Notes

References
Galpin, F. W. (1931). "Viola Pomposa and Violoncello Piccolo." Music & Letters, v. 12, no. 4 (October 1931), pp. 354–364.
Paulinyi, Zoltan. (2010). "The viola pomposa growing usage." Romania: "No 14 Plus Minus Contemporary Music Journal", n. 16 (October 10, 2010).
Paulinyi, Zoltan. (2010). "Comments on previous article about the viola pomposa and its related instruments". Romania: No. 14 Plus Minus Contemporary Music Journal, n. 16 (Nov 25, 2010).
Sibyl Marcuse, A Survey of Musical Instruments.  NYC, Harper & Row, 1975, p. 530.

External links
Report about viola pomposa (French)
[https://tiensviolin.com/vi/pomposa-5-string (Vietnam)

Video
Crowl, Harry. 2008. "Antíteses, Concert for viola pomposa and full orchestra". Recorded in 2010.

Listening
CD Images with Brazilian pieces for viola pomposa.
Viola pomposa MP3s

Compositions
 Paulinyi's works for viola pomposa edited by MusicaNeo.

Violas